"Cry Me a River" is a song by American singer-songwriter Justin Timberlake for his debut solo album, Justified (2002). It was written by Scott Storch with producer Timbaland and was inspired by Timberlake's former relationship with singer Britney Spears. Jive Records released the song to contemporary hit and rhythmic radio in the United States on November 25, 2002, as the album's second single. Accompanied by an electric piano, beatbox, guitars, synthesizers, Arabian-inspired riffs and Gregorian chants, "Cry Me a River" is a pop and R&B song about a heartbroken man who moves on from his last girlfriend, who had cheated on him. The song's music video featured a Spears lookalike and fueled the rumors that she had, from September 2001 to February 2002, cheated on Timberlake with Wade Robson, his choreographer.

"Cry Me a River" received acclaim from music critics, who praised Timbaland's production while calling it a standout track on Justified. The song earned several lists of best of the year and the decade (2000s), while Rolling Stone included it on their 500 Greatest Songs of All Time at 484. It won the Grammy Award for Best Male Pop Vocal Performance at the 2004 ceremony. The song peaked at number three on the US Billboard Hot 100 and Pop Songs charts and charted in the top ten in other countries. It was certified double platinum by the Australian Recording Industry Association (ARIA) and platinum by the British Phonographic Industry (BPI).

Filmmaker Francis Lawrence directed the music video for "Cry Me a River" at 24860 Pacific Coast Hwy in Malibu, California. In the controversial video, Timberlake's character invades the home of his ex-lover and films himself having sexual activity with another woman. Spears alleged that the video was a publicity stunt, but Timberlake maintained that she did not inspire the production. In 2011, however, Timberlake admitted his breakup with Spears inspired the video. The clip won the awards for Best Male Video and Best Pop Video at the 2003 MTV Video Music Awards. Timberlake performed "Cry Me a River" on his four major concert tours: The Justified World Tour (2003–04), Justified and Stripped Tour (2003), FutureSex/LoveShow (2007), and The 20/20 Experience World Tour (2013–15). The song has been covered by various artists without chart success.

Writing and production

Timberlake and Scott Storch wrote "Cry Me a River" with Timbaland, who produced the song. Storch found working with Timberlake easy because of the song's meaning. Reporters believed its lyrics were inspired by Timberlake's relationship with singer Britney Spears, which ended in 2002. Timberlake told MTV News, "I'm not going to specifically say if any song is about anybody. I will say writing a couple of songs on the record helped me deal with a couple of things. To me songs are songs. They can stem from things that completely happened to you personally or they can stem from ideas that you think could happen to you." In December 2011, Timberlake admitted that he had written "Cry Me a River" after an argument with Spears: "I was on a phone call that was not the most enjoyable phone call. I walked into the studio and he [Timbaland] could tell I was visibly angry." Timbaland recalled, "I was like, 'Man, don't worry about it' and he was like, 'I can't believe she did that to me' and he was like, 'You were my sun, you were my earth.'"

"Cry Me a River" was recorded at Westlake Recording Studios in Los Angeles by Senator Jimmy D, while Carlos "Storm" Martinez served as the assistant engineer. Jimmy Douglass and Timbaland mixed the song at Manhattan Center Studios in New York City. Timberlake arranged the vocals and was a backup singer alongside Timbaland, Marsha Ambrosius, Tye Tribbett and Greater Anointing. The ad lib "Cry me, cry meeee" at the end of the song was among Ambrosius's contributions. Storch compared Timberlake's vocals on "Cry Me a River" to R&B and rock singer Daryl Hall. Larry Gold provided the string arrangement and conducting, while Storch and Bill Pettaway played the clavinet and guitar, respectively.

Release and response
"Cry Me a River" was released as the second single from Justified. Jive Records serviced the song to contemporary and rhythmic radio in the United States on November 25, 2002. On December 23, three remixes were released as a 12-inch single in Canada and France. On January 5, 2003, the song was sent to urban contemporary radio stations in the US. It was released as a CD single in Germany on January 23. The single contains the album version of the song and the remixes on its 12-inch single release. A CD single, which included Johnny Fiasco's remix of the song and two additional remixes of "Like I Love You", was released on February 3 and 6 in the United Kingdom and Canada, respectively. "Cry Me a River" was released as a CD single in the US on February 18. The single features the album version of the song, its instrumental and four remixes.

Following its release, there was media speculation that Spears had written a song as a response to "Cry Me a River"; she denied the rumors, explaining, "You know, it's funny. I read that I wrote this song and I wrote these lyrics and that's not my style. I would never do that." Annet Artani, who co-wrote Spears' 2003 song "Everytime", stated that the song was written as a response to "Cry Me a River". When asked during an interview with Diane Sawyer on PrimeTime in 2003, if "Everytime" was about Timberlake, Spears responded, "I'll let the song speak for itself."

Composition and lyrical interpretation

"Cry Me a River" is a pop and R&B song with an instrumentation that features clavinet, guitars, beatboxing, synthesizers, Arabian-inspired riffs and Gregorian chants. The instruments are arranged into what critics described as a graceful and mysterious melody. Jane Stevenson of Jam! said the single combines gospel and opera. Tyler Martin of Stylus Magazine enjoyed the way that the song unconventionally mixed a range of experimental sounds. According to Martin, the wave synth affects the real strings to create an unusual dissonance. The song's chorus devolves into a choral reading in which Timberlake pleads over the group. "Cry Me a River" finishes with a Timbaland vocal sample heard during the chorus.

"Cry Me a River" is written in the key of G minor, in alla breve, with a tempo of 74 beats per minute. Timberlake's vocal range spans from the low note of C3 to the high note of B4. Billboard magazine critics called "Cry Me a River" a bittersweet song, in which the singer's "familiar tenor belting" is tempered with a soulful falsetto and a "convincingly aggressive rock-spiked baritone" rasp. David Browne  of Entertainment Weekly labeled the song "a haunted, pained farewell".

Lyrically, the song is about a heartbroken man who moves on from his past. A Rolling Stone reviewer called the song a "breakup aria". According to Caroline Sullivan of The Guardian, "Cry Me a River" stands out for its "slow-building sense of drama", which highlights Timberlake at his "husky best". The song begins with the phrase "You were my sun, you were my earth", which according to Timbaland was Timberlake's inspiration to write the song. Tanya L. Edwards of MTV News observed that Timberlake was lied to and wronged, and said this is demonstrated by the lyrics: "You don't have to say whatcha did / I already know, I found out from him / Now there's just no chance." The chorus contains the lines: "Told me you loved me, why did you leave me all alone / Now you tell me you need me when you call me on the phone." Slant Magazines Sal Cinquemani called Timberlake's 2007 single "What Goes Around... Comes Around" an ostensible sequel to "Cry Me a River" both lyrically and musically. Jason Lipshutz of Billboard stated that aside from the presence of Timbaland's "fantastically cluttered production", the difference between "Cry Me a River" and Timberlake's 2013 single "Mirrors" is clear: "10 years ago, Timberlake was broken, and now he is whole".

Reception and accolades

"Cry Me a River" received acclaim from music critics. Jane Stevenson of Jam! and Sal Cinquemani of Slant Magazine called it a standout track on Justified. Stephen Thomas Erlewine of AllMusic selected the song as a highlight in his review of Justified. Peter Robinson of NME described it as a "twisted epic" and "an acidic, filthy little song teeming with spite and retribution, with Timbaland's pounding." Rolling Stones Ben Ratliff viewed his production of "Cry Me a River" as exceptional. Denise Boyd of BBC Music felt that the song's lyrics play as large a role as Timbaland's production, unlike other songs on Justified.  David Browne of Entertainment Weekly concluded that the song is "a genuine stunner" that should leave Timberlake's fellow 'N Syncers concerned that he truly may not need them any more. John Mitchell of MTV News called "Cry Me a River" and "What Goes Around... Comes Around" "kiss-off songs", with Timberlake's revenge on Spears present throughout the lyrics. Idolator staff opined it is the sound of an artist who is "relishing ripping up people's perceptions of him as a sweet-natured teen heartthrob." VH1's Emily Exton wrote, "By stretching the boundaries of pop–and fusing it with notes of R&B, lots of electric goodness, and haunting choral vocals–Timberlake’s kiss-off song instantly becomes more poignant, a pointed reaction to the hurt he’s experienced by someone he once loved." According to Complex, the song "made people completely forget about 'N Sync and start asking what Timberlake would do next." The single won a Grammy Award for Best Male Pop Vocal Performance at the 2004 award ceremony. It was nominated for Song of the Year at the 2003 MTV Europe Music Awards.

For Pitchfork Media it was the 3rd best song of 2003. Rolling Stone ranked "Cry Me a River" at number 20 on their list of the 100 Best Songs of the 2000s; a columnist for the magazine wrote that the real inspiration behind the song was the formation of the Timberlake–Timbaland team, "a match made in pop heaven". In 2012, the magazine placed it at number 484 on their list of "The 500 Greatest Songs of All Time". VH1 ranked "Cry Me a River" at number 59 on their list of the 100 Greatest Songs of the 2000s. The Daily Telegraph listed the song at number 40 on the "100 songs that defined the Noughties." In 2015, Spotify re-ranked Rolling Stones 500 Greatest Songs in two different lists. "Cry Me a River" ranked at number 14 on "by all Spotify users" and 10 on "streams from millennial users". In 2018, Rolling Stone ranked the song 46 on their list "The 100 Greatest Songs of the Century – So Far".

Commercial performance
"Cry Me a River" debuted at number 44 on the US Billboard Hot 100 in the issue dated December 21, 2002, earning the Hot Shot Debut honor with 29.6 million audience impressions. On February 1, 2003, the single reached a peak of number three, becoming Timberlake's first solo single to reach that position. The song debuted on the US Pop Songs chart at number 37 in the issue dated December 14, 2002 and reached a peak of three on February 1, 2003. For the issue dated December 28, 2002, "Cry Me a River" debuted at number 75 on the US Hot R&B/Hip-Hop Songs chart. It reached a peak of 11 on March 8, 2003. It also peaked at number two on the US Hot Dance Club Songs, becoming Timberlake's second top-three song, after his debut single "Like I Love You" reached number one. As of August 2003, remixes of the single have sold more than 61,000 units in the United States. As of 2018, the song has sold 1.2 million copies in the country.

The song debuted at number two on the Australian Singles Chart on March 9, 2003. It fell to number six in the following week. "Cry Me a River" became Timberlake's first top-three solo single on the chart. The song remained on the chart for 12 consecutive weeks. It was certified gold by the Australian Recording Industry Association (ARIA) for shipments of 35,000 units. The single debuted at number 44 in New Zealand on March 9, 2003. After two weeks on the chart, it reached a peak of 11. It remained on the chart for 11 weeks.

In the United Kingdom, "Cry Me a River", debuted at number two on February 15, 2003. The next week it fell to number three, before returning to its original peak on March 1, 2003; it stayed on the chart for 13 weeks. The song has sold over 365,000 copies in the country as of 2015. It debuted at number 14 on the French Singles Chart on April 5, 2003. After three weeks, "Cry Me a River" peaked at number six, and it stayed on the chart for 21 weeks. It was less successful on the Italian Singles Chart, where it peaked at number 14 and stayed on the chart for four weeks. "Cry Me a River" also peaked at number five in Belgium (Wallonia), at number six in the Republic of Ireland and the Netherlands, at number seven in Belgium (Flanders), and at number 10 in Germany, Norway, and Sweden.

Music video
Development and release
The music video for "Cry Me a River" was directed by Francis Lawrence, and filmed in Malibu, California on October 22, 2002. "Lawrence created the video's concept and told MTV News, "[Justin and I] had a conversation on the phone and all he said was he wanted to have some dancing in it, but to do my thing. He told me what the song was about, but in a [general way] as well. He just said it was a kiss-off song and so I came up with this idea and he went for it." Though the name "Britney" was not allowed in the video or on set, Lawrence alluded to Spears the best he could. He explained: "There was just this unspoken agreement between [Justin and I]. Because [Justin and Britney] were on the same label; that’s part of the reason I thought the label would never, ever go for it. It was all about implying certain things, there’s little elements and details that play throughout [the video] and tie it in." Timberlake enjoyed these details, or clues, which included a reference to Spears's tattoo and her newsboy hat.

Lawrence revealed that executives of Jive Records were also nervous about other aspects of the video, such as Timberlake's representation of a voyeur and the tone of some scenes he was portraying with a girl. "That's the thing I liked most about this project, was that he was coming into it with a super clean-cut image with 'N Sync and he's such a nice guy and so handsome and what I was into doing was making him be a bit scary. Lurking around the house in the rain, throwing a rock through her window, being a peeping Tom, getting revenge and doing stuff that's not really what a nice guy does." The shoot lasted three days, and involved a rain machine that gave the video a "sort of noir" feeling. To create the illusion of Timberlake dancing and floating in the house he breaks into, dancers in green-screen suits lifted, dropped, and carried Timberlake around via handles underneath Timberlake's jacket.

The music video for "Cry Me a River" premiered on MTV's TRL on November 25, 2002, the same day the single was sent to radio stations. Calling in to TRL to premiere the video, Timberlake emphasized to Carson Daly, "The video is not about her. The video is about me." The video was released onto the iTunes Store on April 28, 2003.

 Synopsis 

The video begins with a blonde woman, played by model and actress Lauren Hastings (portraying Spears), walking out of her house hand-in-hand with an unidentified man. The couple leaves in the woman's car (a silver Porsche 911 Carrera Cabriolet (996)) as Timberlake rolls down the window of a black Mercedes-Benz S-Class (W220), from which he and his friend have been watching the woman. Timberlake breaks into the house by throwing a rock through a window and proceeds through the woman's house, with anti-gravity jumps and slides, not causing any other visible damage, except for kicking a picture frame of the woman across the living room. Then he searches some drawers and finds a video camera, while the driver of the car, Timbaland, signals for his female accomplice in the back of the car, played by model Kiana Bessa, to go in. She enters the house and goes with Timberlake to a bedroom, where she starts to undress and kiss Timberlake, who has a smug expression while being filmed. They stay in the bedroom for a moment; then the accomplice exits the house but a still-cocky Timberlake stays. As the blonde woman returns, he follows her around the house and hides in a closet as she showers. He gets closer to her and touches the glass surrounding the shower. The blonde woman senses someone in the room and turns around, but Timberlake is gone. She leaves the bathroom and goes into her bedroom, where the video he made with his new lover plays on the television.

Reception
After the video's TRL premiere, Carson Daly noted that Justin's character in the video has "an American Psycho feel" to it, to which Justin replied, "Hey man, I'm crazy." Peter Robinson of NME wrote that the video shows "what Justin looks like after he's had sex. Clue: he looks pretty good." According to Virginia Heffernan of The New York Times, Timberlake channels the character Neo from The Matrix film series, "pacing anxiously around wet and metallic interiors". At the 2003 MTV Video Music Awards, the video for "Cry Me a River" won in the categories of Best Male Video and Best Pop Video. It had also been nominated for Video of the Year, Best Direction in a Video and Viewer's Choice. In a 2006 issue proclaiming Timberlake the International Man of the Year, British GQ declared, "One minute Timberlake was a forgotten relic of teeny pop, the next he's making the video for 'Cry Me A River' in which he's stalking his ex and creeping up behind her to sniff her hair. And within the space of a year no one could give two hoots about his New Mickey Mouse Club beginnings. Timberlake suddenly became Trousersnake and he'd done the impossible—he'd become cool."

Following the release of the music video, Us Weekly ran a cover story titled Britney Vs. Justin: The War Is On. Timberlake continued to deny that Spears inspired the video. However, Spears told Rolling Stone in October 2003 that she received a call from Timberlake saying there would be a look-alike of her in his music video. She states that he reassured her by saying, "Don't worry about it. It's not a big deal". Spears, who had not seen the video, says she allowed him to do so but became infuriated after watching it. She recalled that when she asked why he had made a video about her, he replied, "Well, I got a controversial video." She stated that it was a great publicity stunt, commenting, "So he got what he wanted. I think it looks like such a desperate attempt, personally." After the release of Spears' video for "Toxic" (2003), Jennifer Vineyard of MTV News said her video "[made] "Cry Me a River" look like child's play".

In 2013, Billboard editor Jason Lipshutz opined the clip was "one of the more brilliant musical moments in pop music since the dawn of the century. The visual is JT's most controversial music video to date." He added, "The "Cry Me a River" video served a dual purpose for Timberlake: to court controversy, and to make its star seem more grown-up." In 2018, Billboard critics named it the 24th "greatest music video of the 21st century."

 Live performances 
Timberlake performed "Cry Me a River" for the first time on an episode of TRL, the same day as the release of Justified. He again performed the song at the 13th annual Billboard Music Awards, held on December 9, 2002, at the MGM Grand Garden Arena in Las Vegas. He was accompanied by a string section and a 20-member choir. He also performed the song on the Justified World Tour (2003–04), his first worldwide tour. The song was eighth on the set list of Justified/Stripped Tour (2003), his joint North American tour with Christina Aguilera. Timberlake performed "Cry Me a River" on a promotional concert held at House of Blues in West Hollywood, California on June 17, 2003. He performed a rock-inspired version of the song on Saturday Night Live on October 11, 2003; and it was fourteenth on the set list of his second worldwide tour, FutureSex/LoveShow (2007). During his world tour in Zürich, Switzerland, in August 2007, Timberlake performed "Cry Me a River" and segued into the chorus of Rehab by Amy Winehouse. – via YouTube

On October 23, 2010, while performing at the annual charity gig "Justin Timberlake and Friends" in Las Vegas, Timberlake began the show with a slow and "sultry" performance of "Cry Me a River" and segued into a cover of Bill Withers' 1971 single "Ain't No Sunshine". He later resumed "Cry Me a River" before segueing into a cover of Drake's 2010 song "Over". Jillian Mapes of Billboard described the performance as "completely lovely in an effortless sort of way." Timberlake performed "Cry Me a River" at concert he held during the 2013 Super Bowl weekend in New Orleans. Timberlake performed "Cry Me a River" in a medley with other of his songs at the 2013 MTV Video Music Awards. After the performance he accepted a Michael Jackson Video Vanguard Award at the ceremony. Timberlake included the single on the set list of his fifth worldwide concert tour, The 20/20 Experience World Tour (2013–15).

 Covers 
The song was first covered by Welsh alternative metal band Lostprophets, recorded in a BBC Radio One session. It appears as a b-side of the single Last Train Home, released in 2004. American singer-songwriter Taylor Swift performed a cover of "Cry Me a River" in Memphis, Tennessee, during the Speak Now World Tour (2011–12). Justin Bieber recorded a cover of the song together with Kanye West's 2007 single "Stronger", which he posted on his YouTube account. Canadian rock band The Cliks also covered the song for their 2007 album Snakehouse. British singer Leona Lewis covered "Cry Me a River" during her debut concert tour The Labyrinth (2010). The Sheffield Star described the version as a "beautifully, sitting quietly, almost a capella".  In 2011 New Zealand band Wellington International Ukulele Orchestra released a cover version on their "I Love You..." EP. 

American indie pop duo Jack and White covered the song on their 2012 extended play Undercover. Recording artist Kelly Clarkson covered the song on September 1, 2012, as a fan request during her 2012 Summer Tour with The Fray. In January 2013, American singer Selena Gomez performed an acoustic version of  "Cry Me a River" at the UNICEF charity concert in New York City. In February 2015, Scottish synthpop band Chvrches performed a cover of "Cry Me a River" on BBC Radio 1's Live Lounge. The New Jersey alternative metal band 40 Below Summer performed a cover of the song in their 2015 album Transmission Infrared.
American Post-Hardcore vocalist Johnny Craig is also well known for his 2009 cover of the song, prior to his first solo album release.

 In other media 
In May 2020, Democratic presidential nominee Joe Biden released a campaign ad which took aim at Donald Trump for complaining in a 2020 interview about being "treated worse" by the media than any other president instead of focusing on the ongoing COVID-19 pandemic. The ad was soundtracked by "Cry Me a River".

Influence

"Cry Me a River" marked the first collaboration between Timberlake and Timbaland, and its critical and commercial success started "one of the most forward-thinking star-producer duos in pop music", as described by Varietys author Andrew Barker. Alternative rock band Coldplay revealed that the single was an inspiration for the drumbeat of their song "Lost!". Rock singer Marilyn Manson cited it as one of the main songs that influenced him. In order to use the song in the 2017 film Lady Bird set in 2003, director Greta Gerwig sent a letter to Timberlake, "Your album Justified was that year, and it owned that year."

Rosalía samples the chorus from "Cry Me a River" for her song "Bagdad" on her album El mal querer (2018), featuring a Barcelona children's choir. Billboard deemed the track "a transcultural re-interpretation" of "Cry Me a River." Halsey's song "Without Me" contains an interpolation of the pre-chorus of "Cry Me a River".

"Cry Me a River" was also the title of a 1953 song written by Arthur Hamilton and made famous by Julie London in 1955. According to the Wikipedia article on the song, Hamilton was the originator of the phrase "cry me a river" borrowed in the song covered by Timberlake.

Track listings12-inch single"Cry Me a River" (Dirty Vegas Vocal Mix)   – 8:11
"Cry Me a River" (Bill Hamel Justinough Vocal Remix)   – 7:43
"Cry Me a River" (Johny Fiasco mix)   – 7:56Germany maxi single"Cry Me a River"   – 4:48
"Cry Me a River" (Dirty Vegas Vocal Mix)   – 8:11
"Cry Me a River" (Bill Hamel Justinough Vocal Remix)   – 7:43
"Like I Love You" (Basement Jaxx Vocal Mix)   – 6:04UK maxi single"Cry Me a River"   – 4:48
"Cry Me a River" (Dirty Vegas Vocal Mix)   – 8:11
"Cry Me a River" (Bill Hamel Vocal Remix)   – 7:43Canada maxi single"Cry Me a River" (Johny Fiasco mix)   – 7:56
"Like I Love You" (Basement Jaxx Vocal Mix)   – 6:04
"Like I Love You" (Deep Dish Zigzag Remix)   – 9:40US maxi single'''
"Cry Me a River"   – 4:48
"Cry Me a River" (Instrumental version)   – 4:48
"Cry Me a River" (Dirty Vegas Vocal Mix)   – 8:11
"Cry Me A River" (Junior's Vasquez Earth Club Mix)   – 6:43
"Like I Love You" (Basement Jaxx Vocal Mix)   – 6:04
"Like I Love You" (Deep Dish Zigzag Remix)   – 9:40

Credits and personnel
Recording and mixing
Recorded at Westlake Recording Studios, Los Angeles, California; mixed at Manhattan Center Studios, New York City, New York; strings recorded at The Studio, Philadelphia, Pennsylvania.

Personnel

Songwriting – Justin Timberlake, Timothy Mosley, Scott Storch
Production – Timbaland
Recording – Senator Jimmy D
Assistant engineer – Carlos "Storm" Martinez
Mixing – Jimmy Douglass, Timbaland
Mixing assistant – "Steamy"

String arrangement and conducting – Larry Gold
Background vocals – Justin Timberlake, Timbaland, Marsha Ambrosius, Tyrone Tribbett, Greater Anointing
Clavinet – Scott Storch
Guitar – Bill Pettaway
Vocal arrangement – Justin Timberlake

Credits adapted from the liner notes of Justified'', Jive Records.

Charts

Weekly charts

Year-end charts

Certifications

Radio and release history

References

2002 singles
2002 songs
Britney Spears
Jive Records singles
Justin Timberlake songs
Grammy Award for Best Male Pop Vocal Performance
MTV Video Music Award for Best Male Video
Music videos directed by Francis Lawrence
Music videos shot in the United States
Song recordings produced by Scott Storch
Song recordings produced by Timbaland
Songs written by Justin Timberlake
Songs written by Scott Storch
Songs written by Timbaland
Songs about loneliness
Songs based on actual events
Songs about infidelity
UK Independent Singles Chart number-one singles
Cultural depictions of Britney Spears